Marco Antonio Faylona Alcaraz (born July 12, 1983) is a Filipino actor, model, and former varsity basketball player at San Sebastian College-Recoletos. His first movie was Aishite Imasu 1941: Mahal Kita with Dennis Trillo. He wed on July 8, 2012, to the former beauty queen and the winner of the 2005 Miss International, Precious Lara Quigaman.

Filmography

Television

Movies

References 

Filipino male models
Filipino men's basketball players
San Sebastian Stags basketball players
Male actors from Cebu
Sportspeople from Cebu
Cebuano people
1983 births
Living people
People from Cebu

ABS-CBN personalities
GMA Network personalities